James Albon Mattox (August 29, 1943 – November 20, 2008) was an American lawyer and politician who served three terms in the United States House of Representatives and two four-year terms as state attorney general, but lost high-profile races for governor in 1990, the U.S. Senate in 1994, and again as attorney general in 1998. He was a member of the Democratic Party.

Congressional service, 1977–1983
In 1961, Mattox graduated in Dallas from Woodrow Wilson High School. He received his Bachelor of Arts in 1965 from Baylor University in Waco and his juris doctor degree from the Southern Methodist University Dedman School of Law.

Considered a political liberal Mattox was elected to Congress from the Fifth Congressional District in 1976, 1978, and 1980. In his first election, running on the Jimmy Carter-Walter F. Mondale ticket, he defeated former Dallas Mayor Wes Wise, 60.9  to 33.9%.

Attorney General 1983–1991
In 1983, Mattox was indicted for commercial bribery and prosecuted by Travis County District Attorney Ronnie Earle, a Democrat close to the late Governor Ann Richards. Earle later prosecuted the Republican congressional leader Tom DeLay. Like the DeLay prosecution, the political background of the Mattox prosecution related to an attempt to conceal the delivery of corporate funds to an election campaign. Mattox had received a campaign contribution of $125,000 from his sister Janice, a Dallas lawyer. Janice Mattox, in turn, had obtained a similar amount from Seafirst Bank in Seattle, which had close ties to Mattox supporter Clinton Manges, a controversial South Texas rancher-oilman who was the successor to George Parr, the corrupt "Duke of Duval". Manges was co-plaintiff with the state (represented by Mattox) in major litigation against Mobil Oil Company. Mobil had attempted to depose Janice Mattox concerning the Seafirst transaction, which led Mattox to threaten Mobil's law firm, Fulbright & Jaworski, with loss of its tax-exempt bond practice, a power held by the attorney general in Texas. Secretly recorded by the recipient of the threats, Mattox did not deny threatening the law firm, nor did he deny the Seafirst transactions, his defense being based on the legal definition of the crime of "commercial bribery". After a long trial, Mattox was acquitted.

His aggressive attacks on alleged wrongdoing by corporations gained him considerable popular support.

In 1989, Mattox was inducted into the Woodrow Wilson High School Hall of Fame.

Challenging Ann Richards, 1990

Failed comeback attempts, 1994 and 1998

Advocate for Ending the Texas Two-Step
Five days before his death, Jim Mattox testified to a Texas Democratic Party Committee on the Party's method of awarding presidential delegates based on a primary vote plus evening caucuses. Mattox said the system, known as the Texas Two-Step, was an embarrassment to the party. "Now let me tell you, folks," Mattox said. "This system we've got is an expensive system. It's an unintelligible system. It is an acrimonious system across the board. It is subject to misconduct, it is subject to fraud, it is subject to manipulation. It's unfair, it's uncertain, it's inaccurate, and it's an embarrassment to our party."

Death
In 2008, Mattox worked in Hillary Clinton's unsuccessful bid for the Democratic presidential nomination. He died eight months thereafter at the age of 65 of a heart attack in his sleep at his home in Dripping Springs in Hays County west of Austin.

Mattox's body lay in repose at the Texas House of Representatives chamber inside the Texas Capitol rotunda on Monday, November 24, 2008. Services were held on Tuesday, November 25, 2008 at the First Baptist Church, 901 Trinity Street in Austin. He is interred at the Texas State Cemetery, 909 Navasota Street in Austin.

References

External links

 http://www.austinchronicle.com/issues/vol17/issue26/pols.AGrace.html
 https://web.archive.org/web/20061108172637/http://elections.sos.state.tx.us/elchist.exe
 
 http://www.austinchronicle.com/issues/vol18/issue09/pols.attgeneral.html
 http://www.sanderhicks.com/reagan.html
 http://topics.nytimes.com/top/reference/timestopics/subjects/f/finances/index.html?query=MATTOX,%20JAMES&field=per&match=exact
 http://findarticles.com/p/articles/mi_m2519/is_n6_v15?pnum=9&opg=15543265
 http://www.tshaonline.org/handbook/online/articles/hcd11
 
 https://web.archive.org/web/20081201094733/http://changethecaucus.org/?p=172 Video of Jim Mattox Testifying Against the Texas Two-Step at Austin Hearing on November 14
 http://www.cemetery.state.tx.us/

1943 births
2008 deaths
Baptists from Texas
Burials at Texas State Cemetery
Democratic Party members of the Texas House of Representatives
People from Austin, Texas
People from Dallas
People from Dripping Springs, Texas
Texas Attorneys General
Texas lawyers
Democratic Party members of the United States House of Representatives from Texas
20th-century American politicians
Dedman School of Law alumni
20th-century American lawyers
20th-century Baptists